The Jeffries Ford Covered Bridge was southwest of Bridgeton, Indiana, United States. The double-span Burr Arch covered bridge structure was built by J. A. Britton in 1915 and destroyed by arson on April 2, 2002.

History

Construction
At the time the Jeffries Ford Bridge was built Joseph A. Britton was 75 years old. Throughout his years as a bridge builder Britton had been assisted by his family and this bridge was no different, some of his sons, four by his first wife and five by his second, would have done the actual construction work. His son Eugene Britton built the Bowsher Ford Covered Bridge the same year.

It was added to the National Register of Historic Places in 1978.

Destruction
Just a few weeks before the Jeffries Ford Covered Bridge was burnt down by arsonist the Jackson Covered Bridge had been damaged. On April 2, 2002 the 
Jeffries Ford Bridge was burnt to a total loss. The residents of Parke County wanted the bridge rebuilt and tried to raise enough funds to do it but with the burning of the Bridgeton Covered Bridge the decision was made to rebuild the Bridgeton Bridge and replace the Jeffries Ford Bridge with a modern concrete bridge.

See also
 List of Registered Historic Places in Indiana
 Parke County Covered Bridges
 Parke County Covered Bridge Festival

References

External links

 

Covered bridges on the National Register of Historic Places in Parke County, Indiana
Former covered bridges in Parke County, Indiana
Bridges completed in 1915
Covered bridges in the United States destroyed by arson
Arson in Indiana
Historic district contributing properties in Indiana
Wooden bridges in Indiana
Burr Truss bridges in the United States
1915 establishments in Indiana
2002 disestablishments in Indiana
Buildings and structures demolished in 2002